United States gubernatorial elections were held in 1896, in 32 states, concurrent with the House, Senate elections and presidential election, on November 3, 1896 (except in Alabama, Arkansas, Florida, Georgia, Louisiana, Maine, Rhode Island and Vermont, which held early elections).

Following the death of Delaware Governor Joshua H. Marvil, the General Assembly scheduled the next gubernatorial election for 1896, two years into the term. Delaware's gubernatorial elections have been held in presidential election years ever since.

In Florida, the gubernatorial election was held in October for the last time, moving to the same day as federal elections from the 1900 elections.

Results

See also 
1896 United States elections

References

Notes

Bibliography 
 
 
 
 
 

 
November 1896 events